Theunis Gerhardus Spangenberg (born 6 April 1983) is a South African professional golfer.

Spangenberg plays on the Sunshine Tour, where he has one win, the 2011 Africom Zimbabwe Open.

Professional wins (1)

Sunshine Tour wins (1)

*Note: The 2011 Africom Zimbabwe Open was shortened to 54 holes due to weather.

Sunshine Tour playoff record (0–1)

References

External links

South African male golfers
Sunshine Tour golfers
People from John Taolo Gaetsewe District Municipality
1983 births
Living people